Rihand Super Thermal Power Project is located at Renukut, Sonebhadra  in Sonbhadra district in Indian state of Uttar Pradesh. The power plant is one of the coal based power plants of NTPC Limited.

Power plant
Rihand Super Thermal Power Station has an installed capacity of 3000 MW. The First unit was commissioned in March 1988. The coal for the plant is derived from Amlori and Dudhichua mines.
The water source is from Rihand Reservoir which is constructed on Son river.

Installed capacity

NTPC Rihand is situated 75 km away from Renukoot railway station. By personal cab or public transport bus, one can reach Rihand Nagar. Local market outside NTPC township is Bijpur. If one is interested in a bit bigger market, one has to go to Waidhan which is 30 km away from Rihandnagar.

See also 

 Singrauli Super Thermal Power Station
 Badarpur Thermal power plant
 NTPC Dadri
 Feroj Gandhi Unchahar Thermal Power Plant
 Tanda Thermal Power Plant
 Vindhyachal Super Thermal Power Station
 Korba Super Thermal Power Plant
 Sipat Thermal Power Plant
 NTPC Ramagundam
 Simhadri Super Thermal Power Plant
 Kahalgaon Super Thermal Power Station
 Talcher Thermal Power Station
 Vindhyanchal Thermal Power Station Madhya Pradesh

References 

Coal-fired power stations in Uttar Pradesh
Buildings and structures in Sonbhadra district
Renukoot
Energy infrastructure completed in 1988
1988 establishments in Uttar Pradesh